Amos Mosaner (born 12 March 1995 in Trento)  is an Italian curler from Cembra. He is an Olympic gold medallist, having won the mixed doubles event at the 2022 Winter Olympics with partner Stefania Constantini.

Career

Juniors
As a junior curler, Mosaner represented Italy in four World Junior Curling Championships. He played third for Italy at the 2012 World Junior Curling Championships on a team skipped by Andrea Pilzer. The team finished 9th. Mosaner then became skip of the Italian junior team for the next three World Juniors. At the 2013 World Junior Curling Championships, Mosaner led his team of Pilzer, Daniele Ferrazza, and Roberto Arman to a 6th-place finish (5-4 record). At the 2014 World Junior Curling Championships, he led his team of Sebastiano Arman, Ferrazza, and Roberto Arman to a 5th-place finish, losing in a tie-breaker to Switzerland. Finally, at the 2015 World Junior Curling Championships, he was less successful, leading his team of Sebastiano Arman, Carlo Gottardi and Fabio Ribotta to an 8th-place finish (3-6).

While Mosaner played in four World Juniors, the highlight of his junior career came at the 2012 Winter Youth Olympics, where he skipped Italy to a silver medal finish. After a 4-3 round robin record, he led his team of Denise Pimpini, Alessandro Zoppi, and Adriana Losano to playoff wins against the United States and Canada before losing to Switzerland in the final.

Men's
During his junior career, Mosaner also skipped the Italian men's team. He led his teammates of Pilzer, Ferrazza, and Roberto Arman to a 12th-place finish at the 2013 European Curling Championships. His team had much more success at the 2014 European Curling Championships. After finishing the round robin in 2nd place with a 7-2 record, they lost all of their playoff games, including the bronze medal match, settling for 4th. This placement qualified Italy to play in the 2015 Ford World Men's Curling Championship. The team would add veteran Joel Retornaz to skip the team for the Worlds, with Mosaner throwing last rocks. There, the team finished 10th.  The following season, the team finished 8th at the 2015 European Curling Championships, failing to qualify the country for the Worlds. For the 2016-17 season, Mosaner moved to the third position on the team. They finished 7th at the 2016 European Curling Championships and qualified for the 2017 World Men's Curling Championship. Mosaner resumed his position, throwing fourth rocks on the team, which finished 9th overall.

The team finished 8th at the 2017 European Curling Championships but had much more success a month later at the 2018 Winter Olympic Qualification Event. The team won the event, qualifying Italy for the 2018 Winter Olympics, where they finished 9th. They finished the season finishing 8th at the 2018 World Men's Curling Championship.

Mosaner played third for Italy at the 2018 European Curling Championships, where the country won its first medal at the event since 1979, picking up a bronze. He played third for Italy again at the 2019 World Men's Curling Championship, finishing in 7th place. Later that month, after winning the 2019 Italian Mixed Doubles Curling Championship, he competed in the 2019 World Mixed Doubles Curling Championship for the first time with partner Alice Cobelli. The pair finished the round robin with a 5-2 record, in third place in their group. The pair missed out on the playoffs as their draw shot challenge (DSC) record was not good enough compared to the other third-place teams.

In January 2020, Mosaner, together with Alice Cobelli, won 2020 Italian Mixed Doubles Curling Championship and was supposed to represent Italy on 2020 World Mixed Doubles Curling Championship before the event was canceled due to the COVID-19 pandemic.

After the 2020 World Men's Curling Championship was canceled due to the pandemic, Team Retornaz represented Italy at the 2021 World Men's Curling Championship in Calgary, Alberta where they finished with a 7–6 record, just missing the playoffs.

Personal life
In 2015, Mosaner was employed as a farmer. He is now a full-time curler. He is in a relationship with fellow curler Alice Cobelli.

References

External links

Sportspeople from Trento
1995 births
Italian male curlers
Living people
Curlers at the 2012 Winter Youth Olympics
Curlers at the 2018 Winter Olympics
Curlers at the 2022 Winter Olympics
Olympic curlers of Italy
Olympic gold medalists for Italy
Olympic medalists in curling
Medalists at the 2022 Winter Olympics
Italian curling champions
21st-century Italian people